The Washington Historic District in Washington, Louisiana is a  historic district which was listed on the National Register of Historic Places in 1978.

The listing included 200 contributing buildings and three contributing sites, comprising about 80 percent of the town of Washington, in 1978.

References

Historic districts on the National Register of Historic Places in Louisiana
National Register of Historic Places in St. Landry Parish, Louisiana
Queen Anne architecture in Louisiana
Buildings and structures completed in 1825